At the Gates of Darkness is a 2009 fantasy novel by American writer Raymond E. Feist, the second book of his Demonwar Saga and the 26th book in his Riftwar Cycle. The book continues the events of the previous novel involving Pug's battle with Belasco and the Demon Horde.

Synopsis
The remnants of the Conclave of Shadows, led by Pug, struggle to defeat evil magician Belasco before the Demon horde arrives in Midkemia.

Reception
Publishers Weekly was critical of the book, calling it "comfort reading for Feist's longtime fans".

References

External links
 At the Gates of Darkness on Feist's website

2009 American novels
2009 fantasy novels
HarperCollins books
Novels by Raymond E. Feist